Touché Turtle and Dum Dum is a television cartoon series that aired as one of the segments from the anthology show The New Hanna-Barbera Cartoon Series, produced by Hanna-Barbera. The show also included segments starring Wally Gator and Lippy the Lion and Hardy Har Har.

Following its first airing there in 1962 as part of The New Hanna-Barbera Cartoon Series, Touché Turtle and Dum Dum was later repeated several times on the BBC in the UK as a standalone show during the 1970s and 1980s, and then part of the Children's BBC service in the late 1980s and early 1990s.

History 
Touché Turtle (voiced by Bill Thompson, known for voicing Droopy) and his sheepdog sidekick Dum Dum (voiced by Alan Reed, known for voicing Fred Flintstone) were a pair of heroic fencers who battle villains and heroically save kings, queens, and others in distress. Touché was the brave (if not entirely competent) leader brandishing his trusty sword and exclaiming his catchphrase "Touché away!" He wore a plumed musketeer type hat. Dum Dum was more of a simple-minded follower in a smaller plumed hat and a scarf.

During the run of the show, Touché Turtle used a standard fencing foil as a weapon. Though not particularly bright, he was an accomplished fencer and could hold his own against other sword-fighting opponents.  Despite his expertise at fencing, Touché always mispronounced the word "sword" when speaking.  He always pronounced the "w" rather than leaving it silent, resulting in his constantly pronouncing the word "suh-wohrd."

The series did not follow any lasting timeline or continuity.  Touché had adventures in the Old West and in the Middle Ages, as well as battling villains during the modern era of the 1960s.

A running gag in nearly every episode showed him keeping a telephone inside his shell, and it would ring at inopportune moments when someone called for help. Touché would politely excuse himself, duck into his shell, and take the call regardless of where he was at the time.

Episode list

Home media 
The first episode "Whale of a Tale" is available on the DVD Saturday Morning Cartoons 1960's Vol. 2. “Rapid Rabbit” is available on DVD on disc 2 of The Best of Warner Bros.: Hanna-Barbera 25 Cartoon Collection.

Touché Turtle and Dum Dum in other languages 
 Portuguese language: Tartaruga Touché
 Brazilian Portuguese: Tartaruga Touché
 Croatian language: Korni Kornjača
 Spanish: La Tortuga D'Artagnan y Dum Dum 
 Italian: Luca Tortuga e Dum Dum
 Japanese: 突貫カメ君 (Tokkan Kame-kun)
 Serbian: Vitez Koja (Витез Која)
 Polish: Tuptusiu w drogę (fon. - Tooptooshyu fdrokeae)
 French language: Touché la Tortue et Dum Dum 
 Finnish: Kalpakonna
 Hebrew: טושה הצב (Touche Ha'Tzav)
 Thai language: ตูเช่ประจัญบาน (touché bpra-jan-baan)

Other appearances 
 Touché Turtle and Dum Dum appeared in Yogi's Ark Lark and its spin-off series Yogi's Gang. In those appearances, Touché Turtle was voiced by Don Messick due to the death of Bill Thompson in 1971 while Dum Dum had no dialogue.
 Don Messick also voiced Touché Turtle in Yogi's Treasure Hunt.
 Dum Dum makes an appearance in the Harvey Birdman, Attorney at Law episode "Mindless", voiced by Maurice LaMarche. He and Touché Turtle also make cameos in the video game adaption where Dum Dum is voiced again by Maurice LaMarche.
 Touché Turtle and Dum Dum both appeared in DC Comics Deathstroke/Yogi Bear Special #1 as captured animals alongside other Hanna-Barbera characters.
 Touché Turtle appears in the Wacky Races episode "Slow and Steady", voiced by Billy West.
 Touché Turtle and Dum Dum both appear in the HBO Max original series Jellystone!. Touché Turtle works in the Jellystone Police Department as the chief of police.

References

External links 
 Touche Turtle @ Toonarific.com
 Toonopedia entry

1960s American animated television series
1962 American television series debuts
1963 American television series endings
American children's animated comedy television series
Animated television series about dogs
Animated television series about turtles
English-language television shows
First-run syndicated television programs in the United States
Hanna-Barbera characters
Television series by Hanna-Barbera
Television series by Screen Gems